Johan Nils Erik Witehall (born January 7, 1972) is a Swedish retired professional ice hockey player who played 54 games in the National Hockey League with the New York Rangers and Montreal Canadiens between 1999 and 2001. The rest of his career, which lasted from 1990 to 2010, was mainly spent in Sweden.

Career statistics

Regular season and playoffs

External links
 

1972 births
Living people
ECH Chur players
Frölunda HC players
Hartford Wolf Pack players
Hamburg Freezers players
Ice hockey people from Gothenburg
IK Oskarshamn players
Leksands IF players
Montreal Canadiens players
New York Rangers draft picks
New York Rangers players
Quebec Citadelles players
Swedish ice hockey right wingers